The Autumn Store Part 1 is an EP by The Field Mice, featuring the two songs If You Need Someone and The World to Me. It was released as a 7" vinyl record.

Track listing
7" Single (SARAH 024)
"If You Need Someone" - 3:46
"The World to Me" - 3:41

1990 EPs
Sarah Records albums
The Field Mice albums